INDYCAR (all caps), is the sanctioning body.

IndyCar or Indy car may also refer to:
Indy car, a type of open wheel race car primarily associated with the Indianapolis 500 and the championship circuit
IndyCar Series, the top open wheel racing series sanctioned by IndyCar
Champ Car, formerly known as the IndyCar World Series, an open wheel racing series from 1980 to 1997 and 2003–7